

Events

January events 
 January – Maine Central Railroad predecessor Androscoggin and Kennebec Railroad is completed between Auburn, Maine and Waterville, Maine.

May events 
 May 13 – The Mecklenburgische Eisenbahngesellschaft opens the Rostock-Bützow-Bad Kleinen and Güstrow-Bützow railway lines in northern Germany.

July events 
 July 1 – Joseph Hamilton Beattie succeeds John Viret Gooch as locomotive engineer for London and South Western Railway.
 July 4 – Chile: The first section of the Copiapó-Caldera railway line – the second in South America – between Caldera and Monte Amargo is inaugurated today in honour of the nationality of William Wheelwright, the American businessman responsible for the project.

August events
 August 29 – Robert Stephenson's Royal Border Bridge for the York, Newcastle and Berwick Railway at Berwick-upon-Tweed, England is opened by Queen Victoria.

September events 
 September 20 – The land grant for construction of the Illinois Central Railroad, the first railroad land grant in the United States, is approved.

October events

 October 19 – Robert Stephenson's Britannia Bridge, completing the Chester and Holyhead Railway over the Menai Strait in North Wales, is opened.

November events
 November 19 – Farmers around Detroit, Michigan, burn down the Michigan Central Railroad's freight house in Detroit; the farmers were angry at the railroad's policy regarding not reimbursing them for livestock killed by trains when the stock wandered onto the tracks.
 November 20 – The first train operates on the Milwaukee, St. Paul and Pacific Railroad, a predecessor of the Milwaukee Road.

Unknown date events
 The Richmond and Danville Railroad begins operation in Virginia.
 Construction begins on the first transcontinental railroad to be completed, the Panama Railway.

Births

February births
 February 27 – Henry Huntington, nephew of Collis P. Huntington and executive in charge of Pacific Electric in the early part of the 20th century (d. 1927).

November births
 November 19 – Jule Murat Hannaford, president of Northern Pacific Railway 1913–1920 (d. 1934).

Deaths

July deaths
 July 7 – Timothy Hackworth, English steam locomotive builder (b. 1786).

References